Estadio Regional de Los Andes is a multi-use stadium in Los Andes, Chile.  It is currently used mostly for football matches and is the home stadium of Trasandino. The stadium holds 3,313 people and was built in 1996.

References 

Football venues in Chile
Sports venues in Valparaíso Region